Susan Nelson (born 5 June 1961) is a science writer and broadcaster. She is a former BBC science correspondent.

Early life and education 
Nelson studied physics at University College Cardiff. She won a Knight-Wallace Fellowship at the University of Michigan in 2004.

Career
Nelson was presenter of Formula Five on BBC Radio 5 from 1990 to 1994. In 1997 she presented Right Stuff, Wrong Sex : Female Astronauts. From 1997 to 2005 she was a science and technology correspondent for BBC News 24 and the science correspondent for the BBC Television News. She was a presenter of The Material World on BBC Radio 4. Nelson has also presented a number of science series on Radio 4, including Britain's Modern Brunels and Citizen Scientist in 2006. She produced Women with the Right Stuff on the BBC World Service. She began to present the Planet Earth podcasts in 2008. In 2010 she was made editor of The Biologist.

Nelson makes films for the European Space Agency. She hosts the podcast Space Boffins through her media company Boffin Media, which has welcomed guests such as Buzz Aldrin, Eileen Collins, Helen Sharman and Tim Peake. She presented the 2017 BBC World Service documentary Before I Go. In 2018 she was taken to SAI International School with the British Council.

Books 
In 2004 she wrote How to Clone the Perfect Blonde. In 2011 she published How to Live Forever: Lives Less Ordinary. The rights to Nelson's third book,Wally Funk's Race for Space: On the Road with a Forgotten Pioneer of Aviation, were acquired by The Westbourne Press in November 2017. Wally Funk was one of the Mercury 13. It will be released in October 2018.

Personal life 
At age 60 Nelson was diagnosed with autism.

Awards 
 Association of British Science Writer’s Award
 BT Technology Journalist Award for Robo Sapiens
 Glaxo Wellcome Science Writers' Award
New York Festival International Radio Program Award 2018

References

External links
 Her website
 Britain's Modern Brunels
 Citizen Scientist
 The Material World

1961 births
Living people
British radio personalities
British science journalists
People educated at Wirral Grammar School for Girls
Mass media people from Bournemouth
BBC Radio 4 presenters